111 Street is a major arterial road in south Edmonton, Alberta, Canada. The south leg of the LRT runs between the northbound and southbound lanes north of 23 Avenue. It passes by Southgate Centre and the former location of Heritage Mall, now the location of the Century Park transit-oriented development.

111 Street was originally part of the 1963 Metro Edmonton Transportation Study (METS), which proposed a downtown freeway loop and feeder routes, including three southern approaches from Highway 2 via 111 Street, Calgary Trail, and 91 Street / Mill Creek Ravine. As 111 Street was constructed,  a wide right-of-way was integrated; however the freeway plan was ultimately cancelled. In the 2000s, the LRT Capital Line was expanded and constructed along the median and opened in 2010.

Neighbourhoods
List of neighbourhoods 111 Street runs through, in order from south to north:

Allard 

Desroches 

Callaghan

Southbrook

Rutherford
Blackmud Creek
Richford
MacEwan
Blackburne
Twin Brooks
Skyrattler
Keheewin
Ermineskin
Blue Quill
Steinhauer
Greenfield
Rideau Park
Royal Gardens
Malmo Plains
Empire Park
Lendrum Place

Major intersections
This is a list of major intersections, starting at the south end of 111 Street.

See also 

 List of streets in Edmonton
 Transportation in Edmonton

References

Roads in Edmonton